Kanesville may refer to one of the following places in the United States:

Council Bluffs, Iowa, formerly known as Kanesville
Kanesville, Utah, a former unincorporated community in Weber County

See also
Kanesville Tabernacle, a log building in Council Bluffs, Iowa
Kaneville, Illinois
Kaneville Township, Kane County, Illinois